Kamyshenka is a rural locality (a selo) in Cheryomushkinskoye Selsoviet, Zalesovsky District, Altai Krai, Russia. The population was 2 as of 2013. There is 1 street.

Geography 
Kamyshenka is located 45 km west of Zalesovo (the district's administrative centre) by road. Maly Kaltay is the nearest rural locality.

References 

Rural localities in Zalesovsky District